Acinetobacter piscicola is a Gram-positive, facultative anaerobic and non-motile bacterium from the genus of Acinetobacter which has been isolated from the fish Maccullochella peelii peelii.

References 

Moraxellaceae
Bacteria described in 2018